The Frederick River is a river that is located in the Gascoyne and Pilbara regions of Western Australia.

The headwaters of the river rise in the Kenneth Range. The river flows in a south-westerly direction, joined by one minor tributary until it reaches its confluence with the Lyons River near Cobra Station homestead. The river descends  over  course.

The river was named in 1866 by the explorer Edward Hooley who was on expedition in the area after Frederick Roe, the son of John Septimus Roe.

See also

List of watercourses in Western Australia

References

Rivers of the Gascoyne region
Rivers of the Pilbara region